John Harold Ostrom (February 18, 1928 – July 16, 2005) was an American paleontologist who revolutionized modern understanding of dinosaurs during the 1960s, inspiring a "dinosaur renaissance" alongside his pupil Robert T. Bakker.

As first proposed by Thomas Henry Huxley in the 1860s, Ostrom showed that dinosaurs were more like big non-flying birds than they were like lizards (or "saurians"), and even proved that birds themselves are a type of theropod saurischian dinosaur. Since dinosaurs themselves are considered reptiles, Ostrom's work made zoologists question whether birds should be considered an order of Reptilia instead of their own class, Aves.

The first of Ostrom's broad-based reviews of the osteology and phylogeny of the primitive bird Archaeopteryx appeared in 1976. His reaction to the eventual discovery of feathered dinosaurs in China, after years of acrimonious debate, was bittersweet.

Early life and career 

Ostrom was born in New York in 1928 and grew up in Schenectady. As a pre-medical undergraduate student at Union College, he originally aimed to prepare for medical school in order to become a physician like his father. However, an elective course in geology and George Gaylord Simpson's book The Meaning of Evolution inspired him to change his career plans, and he earned his bachelor's degree in geology in 1951. As an undergraduate and then as a research assistant during the 1950s, he learned about vertebrate paleontology from Simpson and Edwin H. Colbert at the American Museum of Natural History.

Ostrom enrolled at Columbia University as a graduate student under his advisor Ned Colbert, and earned his Ph.D. in 1960 with a thesis on North American hadrosaurs that was based on the skull collection housed at the AMNH. In 1952 he married Nancy Grace Hartman (d. 2003) and they had two daughters, Karen and Alicia.

Ostrom taught for one year at Brooklyn College in 1955 before joining the faculty at Beloit College the following year. In 1961 he accepted a professorship at Yale University, where he remained throughout his career. As a new professor at Yale, Ostrom was named the assistant curator for vertebrate paleontology at the Peabody Museum of Natural History, and became Curator Emeritus in 1971. Throughout his career, Ostrom led and organized fossil-hunting expeditions to Wyoming and Montana, edited the American Journal of Science, published over a dozen books for both popular and lay audiences, and was the recipient of numerous awards and honors. He retired from Yale in 1992, but continued his writing and research there until his health failed. Ostrom died from complications of Alzheimer's disease in July 2005 at the age of 77 in Litchfield, Connecticut.

Key discoveries 

In the field of paleontology, Ostrom is responsible for the following key discoveries:

Hadrosaurs 
 
Ostrom's work first achieved international attention with his studies of the unique hadrosaur nasal apparatus, which had not been convincingly explained by the early 1960s. By examining the olfactory apparatuses of modern reptiles and drawing comparisons via comparative morphology, Ostrom concluded that hadrosaurs likely developed an acute sense of smell by a lengthening of the nasal passages into long chambers that wound around the skull and were protected by bony crests. He speculated in a subsequent paper that hadrosaurs had need for such an acute sense of smell as a defense against larger carnivorous dinosaurs, of which the hadrosaur body plan had little in the way of armor and speed.

This hypothesis led Ostrom to further conclude that ecology of hadrosaurs was more likely to be that of dry ground than swampy, aquatic environments, thought to be the case at the time. This idea became justified by a 1922 paper that Ostrom rediscovered in 1964, which described the stomach contents of a mummified specimen of the hadrosaur Anatosaurus, which included conifer needles, twigs, fruit and seeds, plant matter that would be consumed in a terrestrial environment.

Ostrom's reading of fossilized Hadrosaurus trackways also led him to the conclusion that these duckbilled dinosaurs traveled in herds.

Warm-blooded dinosaurs 

Due in large part to his earlier research on hadrosaurs—and his conclusion that they were likely upright, terrestrial animals rather than sluggish, swamp-bound lizards—Ostrom was one of the first paleontologists to grasp the implications of the amount of energy it would take such large animals (and their still larger predators, such as Tyrannosaurus rex) to stand and move erect. At the first North American Paleontological Convention, held at the Chicago Field Museum in 1969, Ostrom spoke out against the accepted wisdom that Mesozoic climates were universally tropical and that such warm climates would be necessary to sustain large animals with lizard-like metabolisms. Ostrom supported this view by noting the correlation of erect posture and locomotion with high metabolism and body temperature in modern mammals and birds, stating that this relationship cannot be accidental.

The observation that dinosaurs, thought to be uniformly cold-blooded at the time, could not be used as indicators of paleoclimate was further validated in 1973 with the discovery of hadrosaur fossils above the Cretaceous Canadian arctic circle by the Canadian paleontologist Dale Russell. Ostrom's reappraisal of dinosaurs as endothermic was considered radical at the time, but its ability to resolve outstanding contradictions in dinosaur physiology immediately drew many followers, and would be supported by many future discoveries.

Deinonychus 

His 1964 discovery of additional Deinonychus fossils is considered one of the most important fossil finds in history. Deinonychus was an active predator that clearly killed its prey by leaping and slashing or stabbing with its "terrible claw", the meaning of the animal's genus name. Evidence of a truly active lifestyle included long strings of muscle running along the tail, making it a stiff counterbalance for jumping and running. The conclusion that at least some dinosaurs had a high metabolism, and were thus in some cases warm-blooded, was popularized by his student Robert T. Bakker. This helped to change the impression of dinosaurs as the sluggish, slow, cold-blooded lizards which had prevailed since the turn of the century.

The implications of Deinonychus changed depictions of dinosaurs both by professional illustrators and as perceived by the public eye. The find is also credited with triggering the "dinosaur renaissance", a term coined in a 1975 issue of Scientific American by Bakker to describe the renewed debates causing an influx of interest in paleontology. The "renaissance" has lasted from the 1970s to the present and has doubled recorded dinosaur diversity.

Archaeopteryx and the origin of flight 
Ostrom's interest in the dinosaur-bird connection started with his study of what is now known as the Haarlem Archaeopteryx. Discovered in 1855, it was actually the first specimen recovered but, incorrectly labeled as Pterodactylus crassipes, it languished in the Teylers Museum in the Netherlands, until Ostrom's 1970 paper (and 1972 description) correctly identified it as one of only eight "first birds" (counting the solitary feather).

Cultural influence 
John Ostrom's work on the functional morphology of dinosaurs found that the claws and tendon scars in the tail would indicate a running position. And so the whole posture of bipedal dinosaurs changed to one of agile, fast-running, fearsome predators. This inspired a new generation of dinosaur movies and also museums worldwide changed their dinosaur bone displays.

In 1966 John H. Ostrom was instrumental in the establishment of Dinosaur State Park in Rocky Hill, Connecticut ("because the governor was besieged by letters from schoolchildren swayed into dino-mania by Ostrom").

Dinosaur dig sites 

John Ostrom set up a full-time dig site at the Big Horn Basin, Wyoming in the 1960s, as well he spent a lot of time digging at Rocky Hill.

Scientific classification 
 In 1970, John Ostrom gave Microvenator celer its formal name (meaning "fast small hunter"). 
 Also in 1970, he named Tenontosaurus tilletti (meaning "tendon lizard").
 In 1993, James Kirkland, Robert Gaston, and Donald Burge named a fossil Utahraptor ostrommaysorum for John Ostrom and Chris Mays. The largest discovered example of this species is 23 feet long and had an estimated live weight over 1000 pounds.
 In 1998, Catherine Forster named a fossil Rahonavis ostromi (meaning "Ostrom's menace from the clouds") in honour of John Ostrom. The fossil is that of a primitive winged creature with a two-foot wingspan, feathers and a sickle-shaped claw on its second toe designed for slashing prey, similar to Deinonychus and Archaeopteryx.
 In 2017, Ostromia (a new genus named for the Haarlem specimen, formerly of Archaeopteryx) was named in his honor.

References

Notes

Sources
 . May 1975. John H. Ostrom. Discovery, volume 11, number 1, pages 15 to 23.
 Obituary Los Angeles Times July 21, 2005

External links 
Dinosaurs in Your Garden

1928 births
2005 deaths
Deaths from Alzheimer's disease
Deaths from dementia in Connecticut
American paleontologists
Scientists from New York City
Columbia University alumni
Union College (New York) alumni
Beloit College faculty
Brooklyn College faculty